Svetlana Kuznetsova and Elena Likhovtseva were the defending champions, but both chose not to compete in 2005.

Alicia Molik and Francesca Schiavone won the title.

Seeds

  Virginia Ruano Pascual /  Paola Suárez (first round)
  Cara Black /  Liezel Huber (final)
  Anastasia Myskina /  Ai Sugiyama (first round)
  Conchita Martínez /  Nicole Pratt (first round)

Draw

Results

References

External links
 wtatour.com website
 iftennis.com website

Qatar Ladies Open
Qatar Ladies Open
2005 in Qatari sport